The Sergeant First Class Heath Robinson Honoring our Promise to Address Comprehensive Toxics Act of 2022, known as the Honoring our PACT Act of 2022, is an Act of Congress intended to significantly improve healthcare access and funding for veterans who were exposed to toxic substances during military service.

The act was first introduced on June 17, 2021, by Representative Mark Takano (D-CA). The House of Representatives passed the bill by 256–174 on March 3, 2022, and passed the Senate by 84–14 on June 16, 2022. Due to a previously unnoticed technical constitutional issue with the bill, a revised version needed to pass the Senate again, but failed a cloture vote 55–42 on July 27, 2022, after 25 Republicans flipped their votes. Republicans cited a preexisting provision that made previously approved veterans' funding mandatory rather than discretionary as justification for their vote changes, while erroneously claiming the provision would increase spending authority unrelated to burn pits.  

The failed cloture vote occurred immediately after the bipartisan CHIPS and Science Act passed the Senate, after which Senate Majority Leader Chuck Schumer and West Virginia Senator Joe Manchin announced their agreement on the Inflation Reduction Act of 2022. The act would be approved through reconciliation, which would require only 50 votes plus Vice President Harris as the tie-breaking vote as Senate President. The failed cloture vote on the veterans' bill was widely seen from Democrats and veterans as retaliation for agreeing on the inflation bill.

Dozens of veterans, many of whom were exposed to burn pits themselves, continuously camped outside the United States Capitol in protest for five days. The bill passed the Senate by 86–11 on August 2, 2022, amid pressure from the veteran groups and other activists. There was no change in the funding mechanism or of the bill's text between the first and the second Senate vote. On August 10, 2022, it was signed into law by President Joe Biden.

Background 

Burn pits were used as a waste disposal method by the United States Armed Forces during the Gulf War, the Kosovo War, the War in Afghanistan, and the Iraq War, but have since been terminated due to the toxic fumes that posed health risks to nearby soldiers.

From 2007 to 2020, the VA denied 78% of disability claims by veterans that were alleged to have been caused by burn pits. The Honoring our PACT Act removes the requirement that veterans prove that burn pits caused their illness and gives retroactive pay to veterans who did not receive care for their illnesses after claiming disability caused by burn pits. The Congressional Budget Office estimated the cost of the Act would be $300 billion from 2022 to 2032.

President Joe Biden has said he believes the brain cancer experienced by his son, Beau Biden, was a result of his exposure to burn pits during the Kosovo and Iraq Wars (Beau Biden died of that cancer in 2015).

Camp LeJeune Justice Act of 2022 
Section 804 of the PACT Act contains a new federal cause of action for those exposed to and injured by the toxins in the water at Marine Corps Base Camp Lejeune. Until this became law, only exposed veterans had the possibility of compensation (as a VA disability benefit) because the federal courts cut off the right to sue under the Federal Tort Claims Act in MDL-2218.

Legislative history

References

External links 
 Honoring our PACT Act of 2022 (PDF/details) as amended in the GPO Statute Compilations collection
 Honoring our PACT Act of 2022 (PDF) as enacted in the US Statutes at Large

United States federal health legislation
Veterans' affairs in the United States

Acts of the 117th United States Congress
Presidency of Joe Biden
United States legislation
United States federal veterans' affairs legislation